Reach is the only studio album by American country music artist Meredith Edwards. It was released in 2001 by Mercury Nashville and peaked at No. 24 on the Billboard Top Country Albums chart. The album includes the singles "A Rose Is a Rose" and "The Bird Song."

Keith Stegall produced the album, except for "Ready to Fall" (featured on the On the Line soundtrack and in its theatrical trailer) and "This Is the Heartache" (produced by Richard Marx), and "The Bird Song", "You Get to Me", "But I Can't Let You Go", and "You" (produced by Robin Wiley).

Track listing

Personnel
 Eddie Bayers - drums
 Tim Buppert - background vocals
 J.T. Corenflos - electric guitar
 Eric Darken - percussion
 Meredith Edwards - lead vocals
 Paul Franklin - steel guitar, lap steel guitar, slide guitar
 Bruce Gaitsch - acoustic guitar
 Aubrey Haynie - fiddle, mandolin
 John Kelton - bass guitar
 Steve Mandile - electric guitar
 Marilyn Martin - background vocals
 Brent Mason - electric guitar
 Joey Miskulin - accordion
 Duncan Mullins - bass guitar
 David Nail - background vocals on "But I Can't Let You Go"
 Lee Roy Parnell - slide guitar
 Gary Prim - keyboards, piano
 Robin Wiley - background vocals
 John Willis - acoustic guitar
 Glenn Worf - bass guitar
 Jonathan Yudkin - fiddle

Chart performance

References
[ Reach] at Allmusic

2001 debut albums
Meredith Edwards (singer) albums
Mercury Nashville albums
Albums produced by Keith Stegall